Kalian (also Romanized as Kalīān) is a village in Sain Rural District of the Central District of Sarab County, East Azerbaijan province, Iran. At the 2006 National Census, its population was 401 in 79 households. The following census in 2011 counted 454 people in 108 households. The latest census in 2016 showed a population of 423 people in 106 households; it was the largest village in its rural district.

References 

Sarab County

Populated places in East Azerbaijan Province

Populated places in Sarab County